O Marginal (In English: "The Outcast") is the second studio album by Cássia Eller, released in July 1992. It was recorded between January and April of the same year and produced by Wanderson Clayton with artistic direction from Mayrton Bahia.

The album had poor commercial results, causing her next release (Cássia Eller) to be written with more radio-friendly music.

Track listing

References 

1992 albums
Cássia Eller albums